Baradiya Gir is a small village with population of around 4000–4500. It is located in Junagadh district of Gujarat state in India.In this village all facilities available like Petrol Pump, Gas Agency, Backery, Cement Products etc. Baradiya Gir is a small village but each & every products available in the village. Baradiya Gir is located nearby Sasan Gir which is famous for its Asiatic lions. You can see many lions during night time on this place. The village is surrounded by two rivers named thavki at the west and devthaniyu on the east.

The village used to be famous education hub especially for high school education among nearby villages earlier but after the privatization of schooling, this is not case anymore.in village 1 to 12 standard available 11 or 12 is commerce stream, 4 school here 2 government 2 self finance, very high education is this village, now 2020 village sarpanch is Rajnikbhai Nakrani, most people live is Patel samaj,(edt:JASO)

Although there are many small and big temples within the small village, Krishna mandir (also known as gamno choro) and Hanuman mandir (also known as madhi) and Ramdevpir Mandir are two most visited mandirs within the village. Earlier, the village was developed mostly in the north arena which is now known as old Baradiya Gir while the new village (now called plot area) was grown lately with newer houses and more spacious. In year 1997, the small highway (Mendarda-Bagasara area road) passed within the village almost divided the village in two parts.

The village is still under developed and a majority of the residents living in the village are involved with farming business, while some residents migrated to bigger cities like Surat, Mumbai, Junagadh and have joined other occupations as well. The village has achieved 68% literacy level after continued efforts.

Major places nearby Baradiya Git are Parab, Satadhar, Somanath and Kankai Temple. Jamka, Dadar, Ratang, Liliya and Shobhavadla are five neighbor villages with which baradiya Gir shares its borders.

References

Villages in Junagadh district